Seán Foley (born 29 October 1949) is an Irish retired hurler whose league and championship career as a left wing-back with the Limerick senior team spanned thirteen seasons from 1970 to 1983.

Born in London, England, Foley was introduced to hurling when his family relocated to Patrickswell, County Limerick. His father, John Foley, was an All-Ireland medal winner in the junior grade with Limerick in 1941. Foley enjoyed All-Ireland success with the CBS Sexton Street team in 1966, while simultaneously joining the Patrickswell senior team. In a club career that spanned 25 years he won two Munster medals and eleven county senior championship medals. Foley was an All-Ireland runner-up on one occasion.

Foley enjoyed an unsuccessful underage career at minor and under-21 levels with Limerick before making his senior debut during the 1970-71 league. Over the course of the next thirteen seasons he won one All-Ireland medal as Limerick won the title after a long absence in 1973. Foley also won four Munster medals, one National Hurling League medal and was chosen as an All-Star in 1973. He played his last game for Limerick in June 1983.

Foley was chosen on the Munster inter-provincial team for four consecutive years between 1972 and 1975, however, he failed to win a Railway Cup medal.

Career statistics

Honours

CBS Sexton Street
Dr. Croke Cup (1): 1966
Dr. Harty Cup (2): 1965, 1966

Patrickswell
Munster Senior Club Hurling Championship (2): 1988, 1990
Limerick Senior Hurling Championship (11): 1966, 1969, 1970, 1977, 1979, 1982, 1983, 1984, 1987, 1988, 1990

Limerick
All-Ireland Senior Hurling Championship (1): 1973
Munster Senior Hurling Championship (4): 1973, 1974 (c), 1980 (c), 1981
National Hurling League (1): 1970-71

References

1949 births
Living people
Patrickswell hurlers
Limerick inter-county hurlers
Munster inter-provincial hurlers
All-Ireland Senior Hurling Championship winners